Box of Moonlight is a 1996 American comedy-drama film written and directed by Tom DiCillo and starring John Turturro, Sam Rockwell, Lisa Blount and Catherine Keener.

Synopsis

Al Fountain is a methodic and somewhat neurotic engineer. On the way home from work after leaving his construction site, he takes a side trip for nostalgia's sake in the woodland area. There he meets Buck "The Kid", an eccentric character who gives him a new perspective on his life.

Cast

Production
Production was done mostly in autumn of 1995 in and around Knoxville, Tennessee on a thirty-five day shooting schedule and a budget of 3.5 million dollars.

The motel that Turturro's character stays at during his trip is a now closed but still there is a motel in Maryville, Tennessee, that is named the 411 Motel, on Hwy 411 in Maryville, TN().

The strip club used was "Bambi's" on the Alcoa Highway which is now called Ball Gentlemen's Club in Knoxville, TN().

Many of the scenes were shot in South Knoxville near Seymour, Strawberry Plains, Greenback, and Norris Lake and have been drastically changed since shooting due to mining, suburban development, and culture.

The wrestling scenes that Al and The Kid watch were filmed during an actual Smoky Mountain Wrestling event with Buddy Landell as the good guy and Headbanger Thrasher as "Saddam Insane" in 1995.

Most of the in-town driving scenes were filmed in East and North Knoxville, Maryville, and Alcoa. Many of the routes are not consistent.

Influence and reputation 
Box of Moonlight has a cult following among Tom DiCillo and counterculture fans.

DVD release
The 1998 Lions Gate release includes a "secret" commentary by Tom DiCillo that is not listed on the packaging.

References

External links
 
 
 
 Tom DiCillo Insightful Page

1996 films
1996 comedy-drama films
1996 independent films
American comedy-drama films
American independent films
1990s English-language films
Films directed by Tom DiCillo
Films shot in Tennessee
Largo Entertainment films
1990s American films